The Treaty of Saint Petersburg of   concluded the Russo-Persian War of 1722-1723 between Imperial Russia and Safavid Iran. It ratified Iran's forced ceding of its territories in the North Caucasus, South Caucasus, and contemporary mainland Northern Iran, comprising Derbent (Dagestan), Baku, the respective surrounding lands of Shirvan, as well as the provinces of Gilan, Mazandaran, and Astarabad. The treaty further specified that the Iranian king would receive Russian troops for domestic peacekeeping.

As the Cambridge History of Iran states;

The signatory on the Safavid side was the envoy Ismail Beg, who had been sent by king Tahmasp II himself. When the text of the treaty was brought to the temporary capital of Qazvin in April 1724 by Prince Boris Meshcherskii (a sub-lieutenant of the Preobrazhensky Guard regiment), the population was well aware of Russia's actions. Unruly mobs received Meshcherskii and his entourage with violent threats. He was received with customary ceremoniousness by Tahmasp II, but the latter refused to ratify the treaty. This decision was made as it was clear that the Russians, though having occupied the Iranian territories, were too small to pose a major threat to Iran, even though the latter had been seriously weakened through the frantic events of the early 1720s. Furthermore, Tahmasp II knew that they were incapable of aiding him in expelling the Afghan rebels. There's also a possibility that Tahmasp II was aware of Russia's secret negotiations with the Ottoman Empire (see Treaty of Constantinople (1724)). Ismail Beg was forced to flee punishment upon return, and died in exile in Astrakhan some twenty years later.

All conquered and gained territories were returned to Iran which now led by the emerging Nader Qoli Beg (later known as Nader Shah) in 1732 and 1735 respectively, under the terms of the Treaty of Resht and Treaty of Ganja, during the reign of Empress Anna Ioannovna.

See also
 Treaty of Constantinople (1724)
 Treaty of Resht
 Treaty of Ganja

References

1723 in Europe
1723 treaties
Russo-Persian Wars
Treaties of the Russian Empire
Treaties of the Safavid dynasty
History of Dagestan
History of Gilan
History of Baku
18th century in Azerbaijan
1723 in the Russian Empire
1723 in Iran
Peace treaties of Russia
Peace treaties of Iran
Iran–Russia treaties